Jamestown is a census-designated place (CDP) in Tuolumne County, California, United States. The population was 3,433 at the 2010 census, up from 3,017 at the 2000 census. Formerly a California Gold Rush town, Jamestown is now a California Historical Landmark. Jamestown is the home of Railtown 1897 State Historic Park and the Sierra Railway, which operates steam passenger trains.

Geography

Demographics

2010
At the 2010 census Jamestown had a population of 3,433. The racial makeup of Jamestown was 2,948 (85.9%) White, 20 (0.6%) African American, 96 (2.8%) Native American, 27 (0.8%) Asian, 4 (0.1%) Pacific Islander, 135 (3.9%) from other races, and 203 (5.9%) from two or more races. Hispanic or Latino of any race were 511 people (14.9%).

The census reported that 3,423 people (99.7% of the population) lived in households, 10 (0.3%) lived in non-institutionalized group quarters, and no one was institutionalized.

There were 1,501 households, 399 (26.6%) had children under the age of 18 living in them, 592 (39.4%) were opposite-sex married couples living together, 209 (13.9%) had a female householder with no husband present, 80 (5.3%) had a male householder with no wife present.  There were 100 (6.7%) unmarried opposite-sex partnerships, and 4 (0.3%) same-sex married couples or partnerships. 513 households (34.2%) were one person and 299 (19.9%) had someone living alone who was 65 or older. The average household size was 2.28.  There were 881 families (58.7% of households); the average family size was 2.89.

The age distribution was 752 people (21.9%) under the age of 18, 289 people (8.4%) aged 18 to 24, 686 people (20.0%) aged 25 to 44, 938 people (27.3%) aged 45 to 64, and 768 people (22.4%) who were 65 or older.  The median age was 44.7 years. For every 100 females, there were 90.2 males.  For every 100 females age 18 and over, there were 84.1 males.

There were 1,645 housing units at an average density of 549.0 per square mile, of the occupied units 885 (59.0%) were owner-occupied and 616 (41.0%) were rented. The homeowner vacancy rate was 3.4%; the rental vacancy rate was 9.5%.  1,857 people (54.1% of the population) lived in owner-occupied housing units and 1,566 people (45.6%) lived in rental housing units.

2000
At the 2000 census there were 3,017 people, 1,293 households, and 812 families in the CDP. The racial makeup of the CDP was 91.48% White, 0.10% African American, 2.22% Native American, 1.19% Asian, 0.27% Pacific Islander, 1.92% from other races, and 2.82% from two or more races. Hispanic or Latino of any race were 9.48%.

Of the 1,293 households 26.2% had children under the age of 18 living with them, 45.9% were married couples living together, 13.1% had a female householder with no husband present, and 37.2% were non-families. 31.1% of households were one person and 18.1% were one person aged 65 or older.  The average household size was 2.27 and the average family size was 2.84.

The age distribution was 23.0% under the age of 18, 7.4% from 18 to 24, 22.2% from 25 to 44, 23.2% from 45 to 64, and 24.2% 65 or older.  The median age was 42 years. For every 100 females, there were 87.4 males.  For every 100 females age 18 and over, there were 79.5 males.

The median household income was $25,847 and the median family income  was $34,896. Males had a median income of $27,083 versus $26,250 for females. The per capita income for the CDP was $16,209.  About 14.1% of families and 16.3% of the population were below the poverty line, including 23.3% of those under age 18 and 5.5% of those age 65 or over.

Government

Jamestown is the headquarters for the Chicken Ranch Rancheria of Me-Wuk Indians of California, a federally recognized tribe of Miwok people.

Appearances in popular culture
Scenes from Back to the Future Part III, the final installment of the Back to the Future trilogy, were filmed in Jamestown. A scene from the 2004 movie Hidalgo was also filmed there. Exterior scenes from the TV series Petticoat Junction, The Wild Wild West, and Green Acres were filmed in and near Jamestown, as well as parts of the Little House on the Prairie TV series.

Jamestown was featured by Huell Howser in Road Trip Episode 153.

References

External links

 Website for Jamestown, CA
 Railtown 1897 State Historic Park

Census-designated places in California
Census-designated places in Tuolumne County, California